Lee Dong-hwan (born 9 April 1987), also known as D. H. Lee, is a South Korean professional golfer.

Professional career
Lee played on the Japan Golf Tour where he has won twice: the Gateway to The Open Mizuno Open Yomiuri Classic in 2007 and the Toshin Golf Tournament in LakeWood in 2011.

Lee was a medalist at the PGA Tour Qualifying Tournament in December 2012 and began to play on the PGA Tour in 2013.

In 2017, Lee claimed his first Web.com Tour win at the United Leasing & Finance Championship. He shot a final round 74 to beat Jason Gore by one shot. With three top-25 finishes in the 2017 season, Lee finished 20th on the Regular Season money list.

Professional wins (4)

Japan Golf Tour wins (2)

*Note: The 2007 Gateway to The Open Mizuno Open Yomiuri Classic was shortened to 54 holes due to fog.

Japan Golf Tour playoff record (0–1)

Web.com Tour wins (1)

Japan Challenge Tour wins (1)

Results in major championships

CUT = missed the half-way cut
Note: Lee never played in the Masters Tournament or the PGA Championship.

Team appearances
Amateur
Bonallack Trophy (representing Asia/Pacific): 2004 (winners)

See also
2012 PGA Tour Qualifying School graduates
2015 Web.com Tour Finals graduates

References

External links

South Korean male golfers
Japan Golf Tour golfers
PGA Tour golfers
Korn Ferry Tour graduates
Golfers from Seoul
People from Yongin
1987 births
Living people